Donny Sands (born May 16, 1996) is an American professional baseball catcher for the Detroit Tigers of Major League Baseball (MLB). He made his MLB debut in 2022 with the Philadelphia Phillies.

Early life and career
Sands was born in Tucson, Arizona, and he lived there until he was in the third grade. His family moved to Albuquerque, New Mexico, and he served as a batboy for the New Mexico Lobos, the college baseball team at the University of New Mexico. He also spent time in his youth living in Ciudad Obregón in Sonora, Mexico.

Sands' father, Roger, died of a heart attack in 2012. He moved with his mother, Alma, back to Tucson. After a year, Alma moved back to Mexico to find work, while Donny lived in her Toyota Camry and attended high school. He attended Empire High School for two years before he transferred to Salpointe Catholic High School. For Salpointe's baseball team, Sands had a .437 batting average and 58 runs batted in (RBIs) in 52 games played. As a pitcher, Sands had 58 strikeouts in  innings pitched. Sands committed to attend the University of New Mexico.

Professional career

New York Yankees
The New York Yankees selected Sands in the eighth round, with the 243rd overall selection, of the 2015 Major League Baseball draft as a third baseman. Sands signed with the Yankees, rather than attend college, receiving a $100,000 signing bonus, below the slot value for the pick. He made his professional debut with the Gulf Coast Yankees of the Rookie-level Gulf Coast League (GCL). After his first season, the Yankees approached Sands about becoming a catcher, and he agreed. In 2016, he committed 14 passed balls in 20 games in the GCL and with the Pulaski Yankees of the Rookie-level Appalachian League.

In 2017, Sands played for the Charleston RiverDogs of the Class A South Atlantic League and the Tampa Yankees of the Class A-Advanced Florida State League. In 93 games, he had 25 passed balls. He committed eight passed balls in 2018, and played in the Arizona Fall League after the 2019 regular season. The 2020 season was cancelled due to the COVID-19 shutdown, and Sands worked on his defense independently.

Sands began the 2021 season with the Somerset Patriots of the Class AA Eastern League, and was promoted to the Scranton/Wilkes-Barre RailRiders of the Class AAA International League during the season. With the RailRiders, Sands batted .272 and had one passed ball in 42 games. The Yankees added Sands to their 40-man roster to protect him from being exposed to the Rule 5 draft after the season.

Philadelphia Phillies
On November 19, 2021, the Yankees traded Sands and Nick Nelson to the Philadelphia Phillies in exchange for T. J. Rumfield and Joel Valdez. The Phillies assigned Sands to the Triple-A Lehigh Valley IronPigs in 2022. He was selected to the majors on September 1 as a September addition. He made only four plate appearances with the major league team.

Detroit Tigers
On January 7, 2023, the Phillies traded Sands, Matt Vierling, and Nick Maton to the Detroit Tigers in exchange for Gregory Soto and Kody Clemens.

References

External links

1996 births
Living people
Baseball players from Tucson, Arizona
Charleston RiverDogs players
Clearwater Threshers players
Florida Complex League Yankees players
Gulf Coast Yankees players
Lehigh Valley IronPigs players
Major League Baseball catchers
Philadelphia Phillies players
Pulaski Yankees players
Scranton/Wilkes-Barre RailRiders players
Somerset Patriots players
Surprise Saguaros players
Tampa Tarpons players
Tampa Yankees players